Giovanni Battista Angioletti (27 November 1896 – 3 August 1961) was an Italian writer and journalist.

Life 
Angioletti was born in Milan in 1896 and was gifted with a lively and reflective intelligence. His plans to qualify as an engineer were interrupted by the outbreak of World War I; at the end of the conflict he decided instead to embark upon a literary career, combining work as a journalist with writing fiction. In 1928 Il giorno del giudizio became the first winner of the Premio Bagutta. In 1929 he became editor of the magazine Italia letteraria and started to write for the Corriere della Sera; in the following year he founded the literary review Trifalco.

From 1934 he spent much of his time abroad, lecturing at the universities of Dijon and Besançon and acting as director of the institutes of Italian culture in Prague and Paris. He remained in France for much of World War II, returning to Italy only in 1945.

Here he resumed his role at Italia letteraria, (now published as Fiera Letteraria) and continued to write fiction, winning the 1949 Strega Prize with La memoria, published by Bompiani. In the decade following he played a part in the birth of Italy's Radio 3 and directed a number of cultural programmes for the station.

Angioletti was for many years secretary of the Italian writers' union, the Sindacato Nazionale Scrittori Italiani, and was the first chairman of the European Community of Writers.

Giovanni Battista Angioletti died in Santa Maria la Bruna, near Naples in 1961 at the age of 64. In the previous year his career had been crowned with the award of the Viareggio Prize for I grandi ospiti.

Principal works

Fiction 
Il giorno del giudizio, Torino, 1928; Premio Bagutta
Il buon veliero, Lanciano, 1930
Il generale in esilio, Firenze, 1938
Donata, Firenze, 1941
Eclisse di luna, Firenze, 1943
La memoria, Milano, 1949; Premio Strega
 Narciso, Milano, 1949
Giobbe uomo solo, Milano, 1955

Essays and criticism 
Scrittori d'Europa, Milano, 1928
Servizio di guardia, Lanciano, 1932
L'Europa d'oggi, Lanciano, 1934
Le carte parlanti, Firenze, 1941
Vecchio continente, Roma, 1942
L'Italia felice, Roma, 1947
Inchiesta segreta, Milano, 1953
L'anatra alla normanna, Milano, 1957
L'uso della parola, Caltanissetta-Roma, 1958
I grandi ospiti, Firenze 1960; Premio Viareggio
Tutta l'Europa, Roma, 1961
Gli italiani sono onesti, Milano, 1968; (published posthumously)

See also
List of Italian writers

References
The first version of this article was based on its counterparts in the Italian and French Wikipedias: :it:Giovanni Battista Angioletti and :fr:Giovanni Battista Angioletti. Both are licensed under the GFDL.

1896 births
1961 deaths
Writers from Milan
20th-century Italian male writers
20th-century Italian novelists
Journalists from Milan
Italian male journalists
Strega Prize winners
Viareggio Prize winners
20th-century Italian journalists